Aechmea tessmannii is a plant species in the genus Aechmea. This species is native to Ecuador, Peru, and Colombia.

Cultivars
Numerous cultivars are grown as ornamentals, including

 Aechmea 'Caloosa'
 Aechmea 'Chocolate'
 Aechmea 'Cosmic Starburst'
 Aechmea 'Jimmie Knight'
 Aechmea 'Jupiter'
 Aechmea 'Starbrite'
 × Anamea 'Prima Ballerina'
 × Androlaechmea 'Sampson'
 × Neomea 'Leonardo'

References

tessmannii
Flora of South America
Plants described in 1927